Enrico Neitzel (born 11 April 1977 in Wolgast) is a German football striker who plays for FC Anker Wismar.

Career
Neitzel played in his youth for ISG Schwerin, 1. FC Magdeburg, Schweriner SC and 1. FSV Schwerin.

He played his first professional games for Schwerin before he signed with 1. FC Lok Stendal in summer 1997. After two years in the Oberliga with 1. FC Lok Stendal, he moved to league rival FC Schönberg 95 in 1999. He was Schönberg's topscorer for two seasons, which drew the attention of FC Rot-Weiß Erfurt. For Erfurt he played 31 Regionalliga games in his first season, helping the team earn promotion to 2. Bundesliga. On 1 July 2005 he left FC Rot-Weiß Erfurt and signed a two-year contract for VfB Lübeck.

After two years with VfB Lübeck, he signed a contract with Kickers Emden on 7 March 2007.

On 9 April 2009, Neitzel signed with FC Hansa Rostock.

References

External links
 

1977 births
Living people
People from Wolgast
German footballers
Association football forwards
FC Rot-Weiß Erfurt players
Kickers Emden players
FC Hansa Rostock players
2. Bundesliga players
3. Liga players
Footballers from Mecklenburg-Western Pomerania